Ambrose Lake may refer to several places in Canada:

Ambrose Lake (British Columbia)
Ambrose Lake (Algoma District)
Ambrose Lake (Thunder Bay District, Ontario)